Ostraconophobia is the fear of shellfish.

NASCAR driver Denny Hamlin has this phobia. On July 16, 2017, after winning the Overton's 301 Monster Energy NASCAR Cup Series race at New Hampshire Motor Speedway, he was given a 44-pound lobster by crew chief Mike Wheeler (a trophy that is traditionally given to winners at the track), and Hamlin attempted to leap away. "I have a lobster phobia. I don't know why. I just don't like them," Hamlin stated. "I cannot eat dinner if someone beside me is eating lobster. I can't look at it. So as far as I'm concerned, they need to put it back in the water and let it live."

References

External links 
 What is Ostraconophobia? Causes and How to Cope With Shellfish Phobia

Zoophobias